Gilliatt is a surname. Notable people with the surname include:

 Penelope Gilliatt (1932–1993), English novelist, short story writer, screenwriter, and film critic
 Roger William Gilliatt (1922–1991), British professor of neurology
 William Gilliatt (1884–1956), British gynecologist

See also
 Gilliat